"November Spawned a Monster" is a song by British singer Morrissey, released as a single in April 1990. It was written by Morrissey and Clive Langer and features one of Morrissey's former colleagues from the Smiths, Andy Rourke. The single reached number 12 on the UK Singles Chart. It, along with its B-side "He Knows I'd Love to See Him", appears on his compilation album Bona Drag.

In November 2014, Alex Broun's play November Spawned a Monster, inspired by Morrissey's song, premiered at The Old Fitzroy, in Sydney, Australia, directed by Robert Chuter and starring James Wright.

Lyrical content
The song describes the troubles of the disabled. Morrissey uses words such as 'monster' and  'twisted' to attempt to create mix of revulsion, sympathy and black comedy. By forcing the ambivalent persona of tormentor and savior, Morrissey forces the listener to confront their own prejudices head on." The song quotes Les Chants de Maldoror (Chant 2, verse 7), in which a hermaphrodite perceives himself as a monster and dreams of love.

Critical reception
Steven Wells in NME gave the single a negative review, stating that "Morrissey repeats his one tune endlessly" and that the single showed a "drying up of the old creative gastrics". In a retrospective review, Ned Raggett of Allmusic called the title track "one of the most powerful of Morrissey's solo career, with a relentless, just off-kilter enough rock chug supporting an empathetic lyric about a young girl suffering from physical deformity." Raggett also praised the B-sides "He Knows I'd Love to See Him" and "Girl Least Likely To", writing that the former contains "some of his clearest lyrics on gay life in the face of official disapproval" and the latter emerges as the "surprise winner, even stronger than the title track."
Author Johnny Rogan stated in his book Morrissey - The Albums that "By forcing the ambivalent persona of tormentor and savior, Morrissey forces the listener to confront their own prejudices head on."

Live performances
Morrissey performed the song live on his 1991, 1992, 1999–2000, 2002, 2004, 2013, and 2016 tours.

Track listings
7-inch vinyl
 "November Spawned a Monster"
 "He Knows I'd Love to See Him"

12-inch vinyl, compact disc and cassette
 "November Spawned a Monster"
 "He Knows I'd Love to See Him" (Morrissey/Armstrong)
 "Girl Least Likely To" (Morrissey/Rourke)

Musicians
 Morrissey: voice
 Mary Margaret O'Hara: voice
 Kevin Armstrong: guitar
 Andy Rourke: bass guitar
 Andrew Paresi: drums

Charts

Release details

References

Morrissey songs
1990 singles
1990 songs
His Master's Voice singles
Song recordings produced by Alan Winstanley
Song recordings produced by Clive Langer
Songs about diseases and disorders
Songs written by Clive Langer
Songs written by Morrissey